The 1933–34 Campionat de Catalunya season was the 35th since its establishment and was played between 3 September and 1 November 1933.

Overview before the season
Eight teams joined the Division One league, including two that would play the 1933–34 La Liga, one from the 1933–34 Segunda División and four from the 1933–34 Tercera División.

From La Liga
Barcelona
Espanyol

From Segunda División
Sabadell

From Tercera División

Badalona
Girona
Granollers
Júpiter

Division One

League table

Results

Top goalscorers

Play-off league

Division Two

Group A

Group B

Final group

Copa Catalunya seasons
1933–34 in Spanish football